William Holmes Brown (3 September 1929 – 27 May 2001) was the Parliamentarian of the United States House of Representatives from 1974 to 1994.

References

External links
Famous Delta Upsilon Men William H. Brown, Jr., Swarthmore '51
University of Chicago Notable African-American Alumni William Holmes Brown, J.D. '54
Passings William H. Brown; Parliamentarian of U.S. House for 20 Years

1929 births
2001 deaths
Swarthmore College alumni
University of Chicago Law School alumni
Parliamentarians of the United States House of Representatives